Flings Owusu-Agyapong (born 16 October 1988) is a Ghanaian sprinter. She was born in Kumasi, Ghana to parents Kwadwo Agyapong and Adwoa Akomaa and moved to Toronto, Canada when she was 9 years old. She started training with the Flying Angels athletics club after her sophomore year of high school. In 2006 and 2007 she made the Ontario provincial team for the National Scholastic Indoor Championships.

Owusu-Agyapong attended Syracuse University on an athletic scholarship. While at Syracuse she broke the school records for the 55, 60, and 100 metres and was a two-time 2nd team All-American. She graduated from Syracuse with a Bachelor of Science degree in public health.
 
She competed in the 100 metres and the 4 x 100 metres relay at the 2016 Summer Olympics in Rio de Janeiro, Brazil. She was also the flag bearer for the Ghanaian team at the opening ceremony.

Career
Owusu-Agyapong competed in the 60 metres at the 2014 and 2016 World Indoor Championships without advancing from the first round.

She competed in the 100 metres and the 4 x 100 metres relay at the 2016 Summer Olympics. She achieved qualification for the 100 metres in April 2016 by running 11.30 at the 2016 Miami Hurricane Alumni Invitational in Miami, Florida. With her teammates Gemma Acheampong, Janet Amponsah, and Beatrice Gyaman she achieved qualification for the 4 x 100 metres relay on 8 July 2016 by running 42.67 to win the 4 x 100 metres at the Soga-Nana Memorial meet in Cape Coast. The time of 42.67 was a new national record, eclipsing the previous record of 43.19 that had stood since 2000. The same team also won silver at the 2016 African Championships in Durban in June 2016 in a time of 44.05.

At the 2016 Olympics she finished 4th in her heat of the 100 metres in a time of 11.43 but did not advance to the semifinals. In the 4 × 100 metres the team finished 8th in their heat in a time of 43.47 and did not qualify for the final.

Competition record

1Disqualified in the semifinals

Personal bests
Outdoor
100 metres – 11.26 (+0.3 m/s, Clermont 2016)
200 metres – 23.28 (+1.7 m/s, Coral Gables 2016)

Indoor
60 metres – 7.18 (New York 2015) NR
200 metres – 23.34 (Boston 2016) NR

References

External links
 Official website
 

1988 births
Living people
Ghanaian female sprinters
Canadian female sprinters
Sportspeople from Kumasi
Ghanaian emigrants to Canada
Track and field athletes from Ontario
Black Canadian female track and field athletes
Athletes (track and field) at the 2014 Commonwealth Games
Athletes (track and field) at the 2015 African Games
Athletes (track and field) at the 2016 Summer Olympics
Athletes (track and field) at the 2018 Commonwealth Games
Olympic athletes of Ghana
Commonwealth Games competitors for Ghana
African Games silver medalists for Ghana
African Games medalists in athletics (track and field)
Athletes (track and field) at the 2019 African Games
Olympic female sprinters